Little Big Shot may refer to:
 Little Big Shot (1935 film), an American film
 Little Big Shot (1952 film), a British comedy crime film

See also
 Little Big Shots, an American variety television series